The Upper West Region of Ghana is located in the north-western corner of Ghana and is bordered by Upper East region to the east, Northern region to the south, and Burkina Faso to the west and north. The Upper West regional capital and largest settlement is Wa. The Upper West was created by the then Head of State, Flight-Lieutenant Jerry Rawlings in 1983 under the Provisional National Defense Council (PNDC) military regime. The area was carved out of the former Upper Region, which is now the Upper East Region. For about thirty-five years, it remained the youngest region of Ghana until 2018 when six more regions were created by the Nana Addo Dankwa Akufo-Addo government; hence increasing the total number of administrative regions in the country to sixteen.

Geography and climate

Location and size
The Upper West Region is one of the 16 regions of Ghana. It is located at the North Western corner of Ghana with latitude 9.8°- 11.O° North and longitude 1.6°- 3.0 West, bounded by Burkina Faso to the North. It covers a geographical area of 18,476 square kilometers, representing 12.7% of the total land area of Ghana. The northern Ghana-Burkina Faso is bordered on the east by the Upper East region and Northern regions, on the south by the Northern region, on the west by western Ghana-Burkina Faso, and the Upper West region on the north. It is the seventh largest region in Ghana in total area, and it is made up of 11 districts. By virtue of its location, the Upper West Region has the potential for international and inter-regional trade and other bilateral relations, but the overspill of criminal activities and disasters, such as bushfires, diseases and pestilence, armed robbery, etc., from the region's neighbors also pose a threat.

Tourism
The Wechiau Hippopotamus Sanctuary is located southwest of Wa, along the Black Volta River in the Wa West District. The Gwollu Wall in the Sissala District serves as the hometown of one of Ghana's past presidents - Dr. Hilla Limann.

Cuisine
The staple food of the people of the Upper West Region is sao or Tuo Zaafi in the local dialect, which is often abbreviated TZ or T-Zed in English.

Economy
The major economic activity of the Upper West Region is agriculture. Crops grown include corn, millet, peanuts, okra, shea tree, and rice. Sheep, goats, chickens, pigs and guinea fowl are raised for meat and eggs. Because the region's dry season is long, extending roughly from October to May, many people leave the region to work in the southern part of Ghana for at least part of the year.

Sports
All Stars FC, Premier League Football

Schools

Administrative divisions
The political administration of the region is through the local government system. Under this administration system, the region is divided into 11 MMDA's (made up of 0 Metropolitan, 5 Municipal and 6 Ordinary Assemblies). Each District, Municipal or Metropolitan Assembly, is administered by a Chief Executive, representing the central government but deriving authority from an Assembly headed by a presiding member elected from among the members themselves. The current list is as follows:

Naa Fuseini Seidu Pelpuo IV - from Wa 
Prominent and famous citizens of Upper West Region include:			
 President Dr. Hilla Limann from Gwollu,	
Al-Haji Amin Amidu Sulemana from Jawia	
Kuoro E. K. Mumuni Dimbie from Wallenbelle	
Hon. Bede Ziedeng from Lawra	
 Cardinal Peter Poreku Dery from	Nandom,	
 Peter Nanfuri from Jirapa,	
 Kwesi Nyantakyi	from Wa,	
 Samini from Wa-Sombo,	
 Wiyaala from Funsi
Naa Polku Konkuu Chiir from Nandom
Naa (Dr.) Puore Puobe Chiir from Nandom
Rear Admiral Chemogoh Kevin Dzang (MSG) from Nandom
 Benjamin Kunbuor from Nandom,	
 Rt. Hon. Alban Sumana Kingsford Bagbin from Sombo	
 Former Deputy Regional Minister Kale Cezario
Lawyer Wahid Bampuori-Iddrisu from Wa
Ambrose Dery from Nandom
Chief Simon Diedong Dombo from Jirapa
Justice Yonni Kulendi from Issa
 Sangu Delle from Nandom
 Maazu Dramani Bayuoni from Tumu
 Hon.Dr.Rashid Pelpuo from Wa
Prof. Frederick McBagonluri
Dr. Samad Dimbie from Wallenbelle
Dr. Frederick Dudimah from Sakai

Festivals of the Upper West Region
Festivals that take place in the Upper West Region include:
Damba Festival
Dumba Festival
Paaragbiele Festival
Kobine Festival
Kakube Festival

References

Sources
 
 GhanaDistricts.com

 
Regions of Ghana
1983 establishments in Ghana
States and territories established in 1983
French-speaking countries and territories